The Bârgău Mountains are a mountain range in the Carpathian Mountains, part of the Căliman-Harghita Mountains in the Bistrița-Năsăud County, in the north of Romania. 

The highest point is Heniu Mare at 1,610.5 meters.

Mountain ranges of Romania
Mountain ranges of the Eastern Carpathians